Adrien Planté (born 25 April 1985) is a French rugby union player. His position is wing and he currently plays for Section Paloise in the Top 14. He began his career with RC Narbonne before moving to USA Perpignan in 2007. He has signed for Racing Metro for the current season.

Honours
Top 14 Champion – 2008–09
Top 14 Runner-up – 2009–10

References

1985 births
Living people
French rugby union players
People from Longjumeau
USA Perpignan players
Rugby union wings
Sportspeople from Essonne
France international rugby union players
21st-century French people